This page documents all tornadoes confirmed by various weather forecast offices of the National Weather Service in the United States throughout May 2017.

United States yearly total

May

May 1 event

May 2 event

May 3 event

May 4 event

May 5 event

May 7 event

May 8 event

May 9 event

May 10 event

May 11 event

May 12 event

May 15 event

May 16 event

May 17 event

May 18 event

May 19 event

May 20 event

May 21 event

May 22 event

May 23 event

May 24 event

May 25 event

May 26 event

May 27 event

May 28 event

May 30 event

May 31 event

See also
 Tornadoes of 2017
 List of United States tornadoes in April 2017

Notes

References

2017 natural disasters in the United States
2017-related lists
Tornadoes of 2017
Tornadoes
2017, 05